The G. H. Erdman House is a historic house located  west of Jerome, Idaho. The house was constructed circa 1920 for farmer G. H. Erdman. Local stonemasons the Otis Brothers constructed the lava rock home. The home's design includes a clipped gable roof, shiplap within the gables, decoratively arranged panes of glass in the front windows, and a fruit cellar in the back of the building.

The house was added to the National Register of Historic Places on September 8, 1983.

References

Houses on the National Register of Historic Places in Idaho
Houses completed in 1920
Houses in Jerome County, Idaho
National Register of Historic Places in Jerome County, Idaho